Black Museum may refer to:
 the Black Museum at New Scotland Yard, now known as the Crime Museum
 Black Museum (Southwark), a museum of engineering components gathered by David Kirkaldy
 Black Museum (Black Mirror), an episode of Black Mirror
 The Black Museum, radio show hosted by Orson Welles
 The Black Museum (manga), a Japanese manga series anthology by Kazuhiro Fujita
 :Category:African-American museums, museums focused on African Americans